—also known as Born Under Crossed Stars is a 1965 Japanese film directed by Seijun Suzuki for the Nikkatsu Corporation. It was adapted from a Toko Kon novel, as Suzuki had done with its predecessor The Bastard (1963) and would do again with Carmen from Kawachi the following year.

External links
 
 
 Stories of Bastards: Born Under a Bad Star  at the Japanese Movie Database

1965 films
Films based on Japanese novels
Films directed by Seijun Suzuki
1960s Japanese-language films
Nikkatsu films
1960s Japanese films